Harbeson is an unincorporated community in east central Sussex County, Delaware, United States.  It lies at the intersection of U.S. Route 9/Delaware Route 404 and Delaware Route 5, east of the town of Georgetown, the county seat of Sussex County.  Its elevation is 36 feet (11 m).  It has a post office with the ZIP code 19951.

Harbeson is part of the Salisbury, Maryland-Delaware Metropolitan Statistical Area.

History
Harbeson was named for Harbeson Hickman, a large landowner.

References

External links

Unincorporated communities in Sussex County, Delaware
Unincorporated communities in Delaware